Route nationale 25 (RN 25) is a primary highway in Madagascar of 161 km, running from Mananjary, Fianarantsoa to RN7. It crosses the regions of Vatovavy and Haute Matsiatra.
It is only partly paved and often in bad condition.

Selected locations on route
(east to west)
Mananjary, Fianarantsoa (already on  RN 11)
Betampona (near Betampona intersection with RN 11)
Fenoarivo, Ambalavao
Irondro (intersection with RN 12)
Kianjavato
Ifanadiana (intersection with RN 14 to Ikongo/Vohipeno)
Ranomafana National Park
Vorodolo -  (intersection with RN 45)
Ambalakindresy 
Manandroy
- intersection with RN7
Ambohimahasoa

See also
List of roads in Madagascar
Transport in Madagascar

References

Roads in Haute Matsiatra
Roads in Vatovavy
Roads in Madagascar